Zelenyi Hai is a village in Kalmiuske Raion, Donetsk Oblast, Ukraine.

Villages in Kalmiuske Raion